In the United States, discrimination based on hair texture is a form of social injustice that has been predominantly experienced by African Americans and predates the founding of the country.  

In the 21st century, multiple states and local governments have passed laws that prohibit such discrimination. California was the first state to do so in 2019 with the CROWN (Create a Respectful and Open Workplace for Natural Hair) Act (SB 188). As of 2023, twenty states have passed similar legislation, but there is no equivalent law at the federal level. A federal CROWN act was proposed in 2020, and was passed by the House of Representatives but not the Senate. Another bill was introduced in the House of Representatives in 2021; it was approved by the House in 2022, and awaits consideration in the Senate.

History 
In the late 1700s, free Africans in New Orleans were able to buy their freedom from slavery, resulting in an increase of interracial marriage in Louisiana. In response, Charles III of Spain demanded Louisiana colonial governor Esteban Rodríguez Miró to "'establish public order and proper standards of morality,' with specific reference to a "large class" of "mulattos" and particularly "mulatto" women.'" Louisiana women of African descent wore hairstyles that incorporated feathers and jewels, which caught the attention of white men. To comply with Charles III's demand, Miró issued an edict that required Creole women to wear a tignon to conceal their hair.

By the late 1800s, African American women were straightening their hair to meet a Eurocentric vision of society with the use of hot combs and other products improved by Madam C. J. Walker. However, the black pride movement of the 1960s and 1970s made the afro a popular hairstyle among African Americans and considered a symbol of resistance. In 1964, the U.S. federal government passed the Civil Rights Act, which prohibited employment discrimination based on race, but it was left to interpretation by the courts as to what this constituted. In 1970, Beverly Jenkins was denied a promotion in the Blue Cross by her white supervisor due to her afro. In 1976, the federal court case Jenkins v. Blue Cross Mutual Hospital Insurance determined that afros were protected by Title VII of the Civil Rights Act of 1964. However, the case did not extend protections against hair discrimination.

In the 2010s, natural hairstyles saw an increase in popularity in response to celebrities such as Viola Davis, Lupita Nyong’o, Ava DuVernay, and Stacey Abrams wearing natural hair. However, the popularity also resulted in increased attention to dress codes and hair regulations as African American workers and students across the U.S. were subjected to punishment due to their hair. Because of awareness to the issue, California passed the Crown Act in July 2019, becoming the first U.S. state to prohibit discrimination against workers and students based on their natural hair. California's passage of the bill has led many other states to consider similar bills banning hair discrimination and a bill proposed at the federal level by U.S. representative Cedric Richmond and U.S. senator Cory Booker.

In September 2020, U.S. representative Ilhan Omar announced the passage of the Crown Act in the House of Representatives, which would prohibit racialized hair discrimination nationally if enacted.

Legislation 
As of July 2022, 18 U.S. states have prohibited discrimination based on hair texture.

See also 
 Hair texture-ism
 Human hair color

References 

Anti-black racism in the United States
Discrimination in the United States
Human hair
Workplace